European route E 844 is a European B class road in Italy, connecting the cities Spezzano Albanese – Sybaris.

Route 
 
 Spezzano Albanese
 E90 Sybaris

External links 
 UN Economic Commission for Europe: Overall Map of E-road Network (2007)
 International E-road network

International E-road network
Roads in Italy